Kokoretsi or kokoreç is a dish of the Balkans and Anatolia (Asia Minor), consisting of lamb or goat intestines wrapped around seasoned offal, including sweetbreads, hearts, lungs, or kidneys, and typically grilled; a variant consists of chopped innards cooked on a griddle. The intestines of suckling lambs are preferred.

Names
A dish identical to modern kokoretsi is first attested in the cuisine of the Byzantines.

According to Greek linguist and philologist Georgios Babiniotis, the Greek word  (kokorétsi) comes from Albanian . According to Turkish-Armenian linguist Sevan Nişanyan, Albanian  is a loanword derived from Serbo-Croatian and Bulgarian kukuruza, originally meaning corncob in these languages. Nişanyan also asserts that the Greek word is not derived from the Albanian , but both words are cognates that were loaned from South Slavic languages independently.

The Turkish word  was first attested in Lokanta Esrarı; a short story written in 1920 by the Turkish author Ömer Seyfettin. The Turkish word derives from the Greek  (kokorétsi).

Preparation

The offal, along with some fat, is washed and cut into ½ to ¾-inch thick pieces, and lightly seasoned with lemon, olive oil, oregano, salt, pepper, and sometimes garlic. The intestine is turned inside out and carefully washed, then rubbed with salt and often soaked in vinegar or lemon juice and water.

The filling meats are threaded onto a long skewer and wrapped with the intestine to hold them together, forming a compact roll usually about 16–24 inches long by 1½–3 inches in diameter.

Kokoretsi is usually roasted on a horizontal skewer over a charcoal, gas, or electrical burner, and may be basted with lemon juice and olive oil.

A quite different preparation mixes the chopped innards with chopped tomatoes and green peppers, and then cooks them on a large griddle with hot red pepper and oregano added. The cook constantly mixes and chops the mixture using two spatulas. When done, the dish is kept warm aside on the griddle until someone orders a serving.

Serving

The cooked kokoretsi is chopped or sliced, sprinkled with oregano, and served on a plate. Sometimes it is served on a piece of flatbread. Some add tomatoes or spices in it. It may also (especially in Turkey) be served in half a baguette or in a sandwich bun, plain or garnished, almost always with oregano and red pepper. In Turkey, common side dishes are pickled peppers or cucumbers. It is often seasoned with lemon, oregano, salt, a pepper, and typically accompanied by wine or rakı.

National and regional variations

Byzantine Empire and Greece

The Byzantines treated the small intestines of sheep and goats the same way as modern Greeks do when making kokoretsi. Through a simple process, the intestines were inverted with the help of a small stick in order to be cleaned. They were then wrapped in braids, in the appropriate shape, or around other entrails on a skewer.

In modern times, kokoretsi is traditionally served for Orthodox Easter celebrations; eaten as an appetizer while the lamb (being the main dish) is roasting. It is also served year-round. Gardouba (γαρδούμπα) or gardoubakia (γαρδουμπάκια) is a smaller version of kokoretsi; it may be grilled like kokoretsi, roasted in a pan, or cooked in the oven.

Due to outbreak of mad cow disease in the late '90s, banning the consumption of offal was considered. However, the idea was abandoned.

Turkey

Kokoretsi is one of the most consumed fast foods in Turkey, being described as "the signature delight" of the country. Although it is also served in some restaurants, most of the kokoretsi is prepared, cooked and sold in small kiosks year-round, and is usually consumed as a sandwich after having alcohol. Kokoretsi makers are called  in Turkish.

In the early 2000s, during the Turkish accession to the European Union it has been speculated by the Turkish media that EU regulations regarding sheep's offal would eventually lead to a ban on kokoretsi, if Turkey ever become a member state.

See also

 List of goat dishes
 List of lamb dishes
 Torcinello, a similar southern Italian dish
 Zarajos, a similar dish from Manchego cuisine, especially in the Cuenca area.

References

Byzantine cuisine
Greek cuisine
Ottoman cuisine
Middle Eastern grilled meats
Easter food
Lamb dishes
Goat dishes
Hot sandwiches
Turkish sandwiches
Offal sandwiches
Street food in Turkey